Japan competed at the 2006 Winter Olympics in Turin, Italy. Shizuka Arakawa won the country's only medal, a gold, in women's figure skating. She was the first person born and raised in Asia to become an Olympic champion in that event. Athletes representing Japan participated in all but one of the 2006 Olympics' 15 sports, with Ice hockey the only exception.

Medalists

| width=78% align=left valign=top |

| width=22% align=left valign=top |

Alpine skiing

Biathlon 

Men

Women

Bobsleigh

Cross-country skiing 

Distance

Sprint

Curling

Women's

Team: Ayumi Onodera (skip), Yumie Hayashi, Mari Motohashi, Moe Meguro, Sakurako Terada (alternate)

Round Robin
Draw 2
;Draw 3
;Draw 4
;Draw 5
;Draw 8
;Draw 9
;Draw 10
;Draw 11
;Draw 12

Standings

Key: The hammer indicates which team had the last stone in the first end.

Figure skating 

Key: CD = Compulsory Dance, FD = Free Dance, FS = Free Skate, OD = Original Dance, SP = Short Program

Freestyle skiing 

Men

Women

Luge

Nordic combined 

Note: 'Deficit' refers to the amount of time behind the leader a competitor began the cross-country portion of the event. Italicized numbers show the final deficit from the winner's finishing time.

Short track speed skating

Skeleton

Ski jumping 

Note: PQ indicates a skier was pre-qualified for the final, based on entry rankings.

Snowboarding 

Halfpipe

Men

Women

Note: In the final, the single best score from two runs is used to determine the ranking. A bracketed score indicates a run that wasn't counted.

Parallel GS

Key: '+ Time' represents a deficit; the brackets indicate the results of each run.

Snowboard Cross

Speed skating 

Men

Women

Team Pursuit

References

 

Nations at the 2006 Winter Olympics
2006
Winter Olympics